The ranks of the Cuban Revolutionary Armed Forces are the military insignia used by the Cuban military.

Current insignia 
In 1980-1989 Cuba used ranks and insignia based on the Soviet system (to the extent of copying the embroidery pattern on officers' shoulderboards).

Nowadays, rank insignia are green colored for officers up to senior colonel and the rank insignia used during the early 1970s for junior officers were reinstated. Moreover, other ranks insignia are now on the sleeve and are similar to those used during the Cuban Revolution by the Rebel Army. Only general rank insignia are still based on the Soviet system.

Officers
The following are the rank insignia for commissioned officers.

Other ranks
The following are the rank insignia for enlisted personnel and NCOs.

Historical ranks
The Cuban system was influenced by Soviet ranks.

Officer Ranks

Other ranks
The list reflects the former non-commissioned officer and enlisted rank personnel insignia formerly in force.

References

External links
 [http://cuba-militaria.org/
 Uniforminsignia.org (Cuban Revolutionary Armed Forces)
 Uniforminsignia.org (Cuban Navy)
 Uniforminsignia.org (Cuban Air Force)

Cuba
Military of Cuba